Reginald Victor Cutler (17 February 1935 – 5 May 2012) was an English professional footballer who played as a winger.

Career
Cutler was born in Rowley Regis on 17 February 1935. He played for West Bromwich Albion, Bournemouth & Boscombe Athletic, Portsmouth, Stockport County, Worcester City, Dudley Town and Bromsgrove Rovers.

Cutler died on 5 May 2012.

References

1935 births
2012 deaths
English footballers
West Bromwich Albion F.C. players
AFC Bournemouth players
Portsmouth F.C. players
Stockport County F.C. players
Worcester City F.C. players
Dudley Town F.C. players
Bromsgrove Rovers F.C. players
English Football League players
Association football wingers